John Perumattam  (3 November 1921 – 18 June 2011) was an Indian Prelate of Syro-Malabar Catholic Church.

John Perumattam was born in Kakkoor, India, ordained a priest on 11 March 1951. Perumattam was appointed Exarch to the Syro-Malabar Catholic Diocese of Ujjain on 29 July 1968 and would be ordained bishop 15 May 1977. Perumattam would retire as bishop of the Diocese of Ujjain on 4 April 1998. Perumattam was one of founding members of the Missionary Society of Saint Thomas and first director general of the society. Perumattam died in a hospital in Ujjain.  He was 89.

See also
Syro-Malabar Catholic Diocese of Ujjain
Missionary Society of Saint Thomas

References

External links
Catholic-Hierarchy
Missionary Society of St Thomas the Apostle

Syro-Malabar priests
1921 births
2011 deaths